Benjamin Joseph Levin (born March 8, 1988), known professionally as Benny Blanco (stylized in all lowercase), is an American songwriter, DJ and record producer. He is the recipient of the 2013 Hal David Starlight Award from the Songwriters Hall of Fame. He is also a five-time BMI Songwriter of the Year award winner and 2017 iHeartRadio Producer of the Year award winner.

Blanco was initially mentored by songwriter and producer Dr. Luke, who signed Blanco to his production company Kasz Money Productions. While under his tutelage, Blanco co-produced and co-wrote a multitude of hit singles in the late 2000s and thereafter. Blanco has contributed to the sale of over 500 million albums worldwide through his work with artists including Ed Sheeran, Justin Bieber, Halsey, Katy Perry, Maroon 5, Kesha, Britney Spears, Rihanna, Sia, The Weeknd, Avicii, Selena Gomez, Adam Lambert, Charlie Puth, Keith Urban, Tory Lanez, Wiz Khalifa, J Balvin, Kali Uchis and Juice Wrld. In July 2018, Blanco released his debut single as a lead artist, "Eastside" a collaboration with singer-songwriters Halsey and Khalid. The song peaked at number nine on the Billboard Hot 100, marking Blanco's first top ten song credited as an artist and his 27th top ten song as a writer, a sum that includes seven number ones. "Eastside" was also a global success, topping the charts in New Zealand, the Republic of Ireland, Singapore, and the United Kingdom, and peaking within the top ten of the charts in several other countries, including Australia, Canada, Denmark, and Norway. "Eastside" was followed by "I Found You" with Calvin Harris, "Better to Lie" with Jesse and Swae Lee, and two songs with Juice Wrld, "Roses" (also with Brendon Urie), and  "Graduation", then he released his debut album later in 2018. A deluxe version of his debut album was released in March 2021 and certified RIAA platinum on release day. 

Levin is also the founder of two labels in collaboration with Interscope Records, Mad Love Records and Friends Keep Secrets.

Life and career

Career beginnings
Blanco, who is Jewish and a native of Northern Virginia, began producing hip-hop instrumentals in his bedroom and recording his own vocals on top of them. His first serious exposure to music came in 1994, when he was 6 years old with Nas' "The World Is Yours" and All-4-One's "I Swear" on cassette tapes, which influenced his early productions. After early experiments with beat making and recording himself on his boombox, Blanco's rapping earned the attention of The Source and executives at Columbia Records. He attended Camp Airy for many years of his childhood in Thurmont, Maryland, where he would routinely perform and host a radio show under the name “Ebba Ebba”.

Blanco eventually secured an apprenticeship with producer Disco D after multiple trips to New York City from his home in Virginia to meet with labels and producers.

2007–present
Blanco was mentored for several years by songwriter and producer Dr. Luke, who signed Blanco to his production company Kasz Money Productions. While under Dr. Luke's tutelage, Blanco co-produced and co-wrote many songs, including hits such as Katy Perry's "Teenage Dream", Kesha's "TiK ToK", and Taio Cruz's "Dynamite".

In 2008, he took part in writing and producing Britney Spears' "Circus" (with Dr. Luke, and Claude Kelly). The song reached number three on the Billboard Hot 100 and number one on American pop radio and is her second best-selling digital song in the United States, having sold over 3.2 million downloads as of July 2016. On a global scale, "Circus" was one of the top 10 best selling songs of 2009 with 5.5 million digital copies sold that year across the world, according to the IFPI.

In 2011, Blanco wrote and produced his first charting hits without Dr. Luke, among them Maroon 5's "Moves Like Jagger", Gym Class Heroes' "Stereo Hearts" and 3OH!3's "Don't Trust Me". The same year, Blanco went on to work on Maroon 5's Platinum-selling album Overexposed and its lead single "Payphone" featuring Wiz Khalifa.

On June 13, 2013, Blanco was presented with the Hal David Starlight Award at the 44th Annual Songwriters Hall of Fame ceremony, an honor awarded to young artists who have already made an impression on the music industry. In his acceptance speech, he joked, "They picked the wrong person, I'm in a room with people I should probably be serving food to."

In the years since, Blanco has amassed 29 total number-one songs and is recognized for his achievements with artists including BTS, Ed Sheeran, Justin Bieber, The Weeknd, Selena Gomez, Ariana Grande, Britney Spears, Lana Del Rey, Miguel, Halsey, and Camila Cabello.

Blanco was named Producer of the Year at the 2017 iHeartRadio Music Awards.

Artist projects
In 2007, Blanco teamed up with Baltimore rapper Spank Rock to release Spank Rock and Benny Blanco Are...Bangers & Cash, a collaborative EP for both artists based on 2 Live Crew samples that caught the attention of many in the industry and sparked connections to future collaborators Amanda Blank and Santigold. The EP received acclaim from the likes of Rolling Stone, Pitchfork and more.

In July 2018, Blanco released his debut song as a standalone solo artist, "Eastside" featuring Halsey and Khalid, on his own label Friends Keep Secrets with Interscope Records. The song peaked at number nine on the Billboard Hot 100, and was also a global success, topping the charts in New Zealand, the Republic of Ireland, Singapore, and the United Kingdom, and peaking within the top ten of the charts in several other countries, including Australia, Canada, Denmark, and Norway. Later in 2018, he released his second, third, and fourth singles: "I Found You" with Calvin Harris, "Better to Lie" with Jesse and Swae Lee, and "Roses" with Juice Wrld featuring Brendon Urie, respectively. His debut album Friends Keep Secrets was released on December 7, 2018.

In January 2019, Blanco released "I Found You / Nilda's Story" with Calvin Harris and Miguel in conjunction with the launch of The While They Wait Fund to benefit asylum seekers in the United States, an initiative by Brooklyn Defender Services, Refugee and Immigrant Center for Education and Legal Services and American Civil Liberties Union. The song debuted with a video directed by Jake Schreier highlighting the story of one Honduran woman, Nilda, and her two-year-old son Keyden.

In February 2019, Blanco released "I Can't Get Enough" with Tainy, Selena Gomez, and J Balvin. On August 30, 2019, Blanco released a song with Juice Wrld called "Graduation", their second collaboration after "Roses".

In October 2020, Blanco released his first artist collaboration with Justin Bieber titled "Lonely". The second and third singles ("Real Shit" with Juice WRLD and "Unlearn" with Gracie Abrams) followed in December 2020 and March 2021, respectively.

A deluxe version of his album Friends Keep Secrets 2 was released on March 26, 2021, and was certified RIAA platinum on the day of release.

On August 5, 2022, Blanco released his first artist collaboration with BTS members Jin, Jimin, V, and Jung Kook as well as Snoop Dogg titled "Bad Decisions".

Media 
On March 9, 2020, Blanco and acclaimed chef Matty Matheson debuted a new collaborative cooking show, Matty and Benny Eat Out America, on Benny's YouTube channel. The first episode featured a behind-the-scenes visit to fellow YouTuber Kenny Beats's show "The Cave" where Benny teaches Matty to rap. Additional episodes included Lil Dicky, Mason Ramsey, Diplo, Laird Hamilton and more.

On April 16, 2020, Blanco made his TV debut playing a fictionalized version of himself on the first and second seasons of the FXX series Dave with Lil Dicky.

On March 31, 2021, Blanco and chef Matty Matheson debuted a new cooking show on Benny's YouTube channel, called "Stupid F*cking Cooking Show".

Record labels
In 2014, Blanco founded two imprint labels under Interscope, Mad Love Records and Friends Keep Secrets. Mad Love's releases to date include the following artists, with many of them having been initially signed to Blanco's development imprint Friends Keep Secrets:

 Tory Lanez (former)
 Cashmere Cat
 Trill Sammy
 6dogs (former; deceased)
Ryn Weaver
 Jessie Ware

Discography

Albums

Reissues

Singles

Notes

Songwriting and production discography

Blanco has written and produced songs for artists including Ed Sheeran ("Don't" and "Castle on the Hill"), Justin Bieber ("Love Yourself"), Major Lazer ("Cold Water"), Maroon 5 ("Moves Like Jagger", "Don't Wanna Know", "Payphone", "Maps", "Animals"), Katy Perry ("Teenage Dream", "California Gurls"), Rihanna ("Diamonds"), Kesha ("TiK ToK"), Taio Cruz ("Dynamite"), Wiz Khalifa ("Work Hard, Play Hard"), Gym Class Heroes ("Stereo Hearts"), Lil Dicky ("Freaky Friday"), Tory Lanez ("Luv").

Awards and nominations

References

1988 births
Living people
Record producers from Virginia
Jewish American composers
Songwriters from Virginia
People from Reston, Virginia
Place of birth missing (living people)
Interscope Records artists
21st-century American Jews
American pop musicians
Dance-pop musicians
American dance musicians
Urbano musicians